Phase 3, Phase III or Phase Three may refer to:

Media 
 Marvel Cinematic Universe: Phase Three, eleven American superhero films from 2016–2019
 Phase 3: Thrones and Dominions, a 1995 album by Earth
 Phase III (album), a 1972 album by The Osmonds
 Phase Three (album), a 2003 album by The Riverdales

Other 
 MediaWiki's unofficial name during 2002 until 2003
 Phase III clinical trials, the third of the phases of clinical research
 Phase 3 Eclipse, an American ultralight aircraft
 Phase 3 Productions
 Phase 3 metro station
 Phase III Offensive